Chlidichthys foudioides, the Fody dottyback, is a species of fish in the family Pseudochromidae.

Description

Distribution and habitat
Chlidichthys foudioides is found only in Rodrigues Island in the Western Indian Ocean.

References

Pseudoplesiopinae
Taxa named by Anthony C. Gill
Taxa named by Alasdair James Edwards
Fish described in 2004